Marian Cucchiaroni Mihail (born 7 May 1958) is a Romanian professional football manager and former player.
An attack-minded right-back, Mihail spent almost his entire 17-year career with Sportul Studentesc Bucharest in  the top flight of Romanian football. He also represented Romania internationally at U21, U23 and senior levels.
Since retiring from playing, Mihail has moved into coaching and managed teams in Romania, the Middle East and Southeast Asia. He has also served as National Technical Director of Romania from 2011 to 2014.

Club career
Mihail began his senior career in 1975, at the age of 17, playing as a winger for his hometown club Brasov, in the second tier of Romanian football, making 24 appearances and scoring 8 goals.
The following season he moved to Sportul Studentesc Bucharest, where he spent 16 successive years of Romanian top flight football, playing over 400 league games and scoring 6 goals.Mihail made his competitive debut for Sportul Studentesc Bucharest on 20 October 1976, aged just 18, in the first leg of their 1976-77 UEFA Cup second round against German side Schalke 04. It was in the early 1980s that he was converted from a winger  to an attacking full-back. During his time at Sportul Studentesc Bucharest, Mihail was Romanian FA Cup runner-up in the 1978-79 season and Romanian League runner-up in the 1985-86 season. He also played 16 European games for the club from 1976 to 1987.

International career
Mihail won five caps for Romania national team between 1982 to 1986.  He made his international debut on 14 March 1982 in a 4-1 friendly defeat to Belgium at Heysel Stadium in Brussels, Belgium. Mihail was also part of Romania`s squad for UEFA Euro 1984 qualifying campaign, but he missed the final tournament in France.

Managerial career
Mihail began his coaching career in June 1996 as manager of his former club Sportul Studentesc Bucharest, in Romania`s top tier. He then managed other two Romanian top flight sides, Brasov and Bacau, before returning to Sportul Studentesc Bucharest in June 1998 for his second spell as manager of the club,  relegated from Romania`s top tier.

In October 1999, Mihail was appointed as sporting and technical director at Romanian giants Steaua Bucharest, the most successful football club in Romania and former UEFA Champions League winners, with responsibility for the first team`s player recruitment and tactical scouting, the Academy, medical and sports science, and the player loan department. During his time at the club, the First Team won two major trophies, the Romanian League title and Romanian Super Cup, in the 2000-01 season.

In June 2002, after a stint as manager of Romanian second tier side Rocar Bucharest, Mihail moved to the Middle East, where he had successful spells in the top flight football, first in Syria with Al-Qardaha, and then in Saudi Arabia with Al-Riyadh.

In June 2004, Mihail returned home to Romania in order to complete his UEFA Pro Licence with the Romania Football Federation (FRF). During that period, he was employed by the Romania Football Federation (FRF) as youth technical adviser, and also helped them to set up the Romanian national youth program. He also had a short stint as manager of Romanian second tier side Sibiu.

In May 2006, Mihail moved back to the Middle East, where he signed a two-year contract with the Syrian giants Al-Jaish Damascus. His first competitive match in charge was a 1-3 loss away to Enppi Cairo in the 2006-07 Arab Champions League.

In June 2008, Mihail was appointed as manager of Kuwaiti top flight side Al-Jahra, on a one-year contract. In between, Mihail returned home to Romania for his third spell as manager of Sportul Studentesc Bucharest, in Romania`s second tier. At a ceremony marking the centenary of the Romania Football Federation (FRF) held in Bucharest on 12 May 2009, Mihail received the Order of Merit in Ruby for his services to Romanian football.  

In June 2009, Mihail signed a two-year contract as technical director of Al-Wahda Abu Dhabi, one of the most prestigious club in the United Arab Emirates, where he was responsible for the club′s youth academy and the reserve team. Mihail`s primary focus was to develop a strong academy set up and ensure that all the Al-Wahda youth teams play the same style. Under his stewardship, the academy won two national titles at the U17 and U19 levels in the 2009-10 season.

In August 2011, Mihail was appointed as National Technical Director of the Romania Football Federation (FRF) and coordinator of all the youth national teams, on a three-year term. The position was new in the FRF at the time and included responsibility for the overall development and direction of football in Romania. Mihail's main task was to restore the competitiveness of Romanian football. After becoming familiar with the situation in Romanian football and many analyses and consultations, both within the football family and with external partners, Mihail presented his strategic plan to stop the decline of Romanian football and to achieve new success at all levels of competition. Priority was given to improve the quality of youth coaches, the performance of the national youth teams and to develop strong partnerships with the Royal Spanish Football Federation (RFEF) to promote new technical standards across the country.
In only three years the new performance strategy has laid a solid base for the future development of football in Romania. This has included reforming the coach education system, revamping the format of the youth leagues and the success of the national youth teams program, both boys and girls, among other healthy developments.
In February 2014, it was announced that Mihail officially left his role with the FRF, just before the election of a new president for the Romania Football Federation (FRF) .

In September 2016, Mihail moved back into club coaching as manager of Iraqi top flight side Zakho, on a one-year contract. His first league game in charge was on 26 October 2016 when Zakho faced away Naft Al-Wasat, the best team in the league at the time, with the match ending in a 0–0 draw. In early January 2017, Mihail announced his decision to leave Zakho due to sectarian unrest in the country, and was replaced by another Romanian manager, Dorinel Munteanu.

In December 2017, Mihail was named the new manager of Vietnamese top flight side FLC Thanh Hóa, replacing Ljubomir "Lupko" Petrović of Serbia. His first competitive match as manager of the team was on 23 January 2018, when FLC Thanh Hóa defeated hosts Eastern AA of Hong Kong 4-2 in the second qualifying round of the 2018 AFC Champions League tournament. In the next round, they were eliminated from the competition by the South Korean giants and two-time Asian Champions League winners Suwon Samsung Bluewings, in an away match played at the Suwon World Cup Stadium, South Korea on 30 January 2018. The Vietnamese club then took part in the 2018 AFC Cup, Asia’s secondary club football tournament, where they joined Bali United from Indonesia, Yangon United from Myanmar ang Global Cebu from Philippines in Group G. Its first game was against Global Cebu on 10 February 2018.

References

External links
 
 
 Romania National Team 1980-1989 - Details

1958 births
Living people
Footballers from Bucharest
Romanian footballers
Association football defenders
Romania international footballers
Liga II players
FC Brașov (1936) players
Liga I players
FC Sportul Studențesc București players
Romanian football managers
FC Sportul Studențesc București managers
FC Brașov (1936) managers
FCM Bacău managers
AFC Rocar București managers
Al-Riyadh SC managers
Al Jahra SC managers
Romanian expatriate football managers
Romanian expatriate sportspeople in Kuwait
Expatriate football managers in Kuwait
Romanian expatriate sportspeople in Saudi Arabia
Expatriate football managers in Saudi Arabia
Romanian expatriate sportspeople in Syria
Expatriate football managers in Syria
Romanian expatriate sportspeople in Iraq
Expatriate football managers in Iraq
Romanian expatriate sportspeople in Vietnam
Expatriate football managers in Vietnam
Romanian expatriate sportspeople in the United Arab Emirates
Expatriate football managers in the United Arab Emirates